Saubusse is a commune in the Landes department in Nouvelle-Aquitaine in southwestern France. Its population has increased from 616 in 1975 to 1,113 inhabitants in 2018. 

The church of Saubusse was built in the 13th Century under the reign of Louis IX of France commonly known as Saint Louis. The inhabitants of the village are called "sibusates".

Population

See also
Communes of the Landes department

References

Communes of Landes (department)